The first series of Ex on the Beach, a British television programme, began airing on 22 April 2014 on MTV. The series concluded on 10 June 2014 after 8 episodes. The show was announced in February 2014. The group of cast members for this series included star of Geordie Shore Vicky Pattison, and she was joined by two of her exes, fellow Geordie Shore cast member Ricci Guarnaccio, and Dan Conn who had briefly appeared during the sixth series of the Newcastle based show. 

Ashley Cain later returned to the beach during the second series, this time as an ex, whilst Vicky returned as an ex during the third series. Chloe Goodman went on to appear in Celebrity Big Brother in 2015. During the "All star" fifth series, both Chloe and Liam returned to the beach as main cast, whereas Ashley and Joss returned once again as exes. Ross also made a return to the beach for Series 6.

Cast
The official list of cast members was released on 13 March 2014 and includes four single boys: Ashley Cain, Jack Lomax, Liam Lewis and Marco Alexandre; as well as four single girls; Chloe Goodman, Emily Gillard, Farah Sattaur and Geordie Shore cast member Vicky Pattison.

The official cast members all arrived in the first episode of the series, but would be joined by their exes one-by-one over the series. During the first episode Chloe's ex-fling Ross Worswick was introduced, and Marco's ex-girlfriend Frankie Thorpe arrived looking for revenge. Ashley's ex-girlfriend Talitha Minnis arrived during the second episode. During the third episode, despite being brought into the series as an ex, Ross received a shock when his ex-girlfriend Emma Jane Lang arrived on the island. After getting together in the house, Vicky and Ross' brief fling ended and they were officially added to each other's ex-list. Dann Conn, former love interest of Vicky during the sixth series of Geordie Shore, arrived during the fourth episode of the series. Meanwhile, Frankie was removed from the house after taking ill. It was announced she would not be returning. Joss Mooney arrived in the fifth episode, and despite being an ex-boyfriend of Talitha, he's also had a previous fling with Emma Jane and once shared a kiss with Chloe. During the sixth episode, Shelby Billingham made her first appearance. She is the ex-girlfriend of both Joss and Ross. After a lot of anticipation, Geordie Shore star Ricci Guarnaccio arrived on the beach during the seventh episode and immediately caused trouble for his ex-fiancée Vicky. Due to Ashley's aggressive behaviour, he was removed from the house during the final episode of the series. Despite being original cast members, none of Emily, Farah, Jack or Liam's exes arrived on the beach.

Bold indicates original cast member; all other cast were brought into the series as an ex.

Duration of cast

Table Key
 Key:  = "Cast member" is featured in this episode
 Key:  = "Cast member" arrives on the beach
 Key:  = "Cast member" has an ex arrive on the beach
 Key:  = "Cast member" arrives on the beach and has an ex arrive during the same episode
 Key:  = "Cast member" leaves the beach
 Key:  = "Cast member" does not feature in this episode

Episodes

{| class="wikitable plainrowheaders" style="width:100%"
|- style="color:black"
! style="background:#789BFB;"| No. inseries
! style="background:#789BFB;"| No. inseason
! style="background:#789BFB;"| Title
! style="background:#789BFB;"| Original air date
! style="background:#789BFB;"| Duration
! style="background:#789BFB;"| UK viewers

|}

Ratings

References

External links
Official website

2014 British television seasons
01